UFC Fight Night: Edgar vs. The Korean Zombie (also known as UFC Fight Night 165 and UFC on ESPN+ 23) was a mixed martial arts event produced by the Ultimate Fighting Championship that took place on December 21, 2019 at Sajik Arena in Busan, South Korea.

Background
The event marked the promotion's first visit to Busan and the second in South Korea, after UFC Fight Night: Henderson vs. Masvidal in November 2015.

A featherweight bout between former UFC Featherweight Championship challengers Brian Ortega and Chan Sung Jung was originally slated as the event headliner. However, Ortega pulled out of the fight in early December, citing a knee injury. He was replaced by former UFC Lightweight Champion Frankie Edgar. The two were previously scheduled to meet on November 10, 2018 at UFC Fight Night: The Korean Zombie vs. Rodríguez. However, Edgar was forced to pull out of that bout after tearing his bicep.

A flyweight bout between Ji Yeon Kim and Sabina Mazo was scheduled for the event. However, it was reported on November 1 that Kim was forced to pull out of the fight due to an undisclosed injury.

A flyweight bout between Veronica Macedo and Amanda Lemos was scheduled for the event. However, Macedo was removed from the event in favor of a matchup with Ariane Lipski on November 16 at UFC Fight Night: Błachowicz vs. Jacaré. Lemos instead fought Miranda Granger.

Results

Bonus awards
The following fighters received $50,000 bonuses.
Fight of the Night: Charles Jourdain vs. Doo Ho Choi
Performance of the Night: Chan Sung Jung and Alexandre Pantoja

See also 

 List of UFC events
 2019 in UFC
 List of current UFC fighters

References 

UFC Fight Night
2019 in mixed martial arts
2019 in South Korean sport
Mixed martial arts in South Korea
Sport in Busan
December 2019 sports events in Asia